Scroggins is a surname. Notable people with the surname include:

 Deborah Scroggins (21st century), American journalist and author
 Lee Scroggins (born 1981), English footballer
 Ted H. Scroggins (1918–1942), United States Navy sailor
 Tracy Scroggins (born 1969), former linebacker for the NFL
Mike Scroggins (born 1964), American professional ten pin bowler

See also
 Scoggins
 Scroggins (disambiguation)